The Carbon War: Global Warming and the End of the Oil Era is a 1999 book by former oil geologist Jeremy Leggett about global warming.

Media 
The Carbon War: Global Warming and the End of the Oil Era—reviewed by Elizabeth Vandermark—The American Institute of Architects

See also 
Half Gone: Oil, Gas, Hot Air and the Global Energy Crisis
Beyond Oil

External links 
Carbon War

1999 non-fiction books
1999 in the environment
Climate change books
Peak oil books